Bai Wan Da Ying Jia (Chinese: 百万大赢家, English translation: Million-dollar winner) was a Singaporean game show based on the original British format of Who Wants to Be a Millionaire?. The show was hosted by Chao Chi-Tai. The main goal of the game was to win 1 million Singapore dollars by answering 15 multiple-choice questions correctly. There were three lifelines - fifty fifty, phone a friend and ask the audience.

Bai Wan Da Ying Jia was shown on the Singaporean TV station MediaCorp TV Channel 8.

The show was also nominated for Star Awards in years 2001 and 2002, in 2001 the show won in the category of Best Variety Program. However, in the year 2002, the show lost to another rival program.

Payout structure

References

External links 
 
 Report on the show (Chinese)

Singaporean game shows
Who Wants to Be a Millionaire?
2000 Singaporean television series debuts
2004 Singaporean television series endings
Channel 8 (Singapore) original programming
Non-British television series based on British television series